Vošce is a small settlement northwest of Blagovica in the Municipality of Lukovica in Central Slovenia.

References

External links
Vošce on Geopedia

Populated places in the Municipality of Lukovica